Plague Inc: Evolved is a real-time strategy simulation video game, developed and published by UK-based independent games studio Ndemic Creations. The game is a remake of the developer's previous game, Plague Inc., adapted for PC and consoles. In the game, the player creates and evolves a pathogen in an effort to destroy the world with a deadly plague. The game uses an epidemic model with a complex and realistic set of variables to simulate the spread and severity of the plague, and the game has attracted the attention of the CDC.

Gameplay

The core game of Plague Inc: Evolved is the same as Plague Inc. - the player controls a plague which has infected patient zero. The player must infect and kill the whole world population by evolving the plague and adapting to various environments. However, there is a time pressure to complete the game before humans, the opponent, develop a cure for the plague. The developer has said that the game was inspired by Pandemic 2, a browser-based Flash game released in 2008 by Dark Realm Studios.

The game series has been praised by the Centers for Disease Control and Prevention who said "it uses a non-traditional route to raise public awareness on epidemiology, disease transmission, and diseases/pandemic information. The game creates a compelling world that engages the public on serious public health topics". The developer of the game was invited to give a talk at the CDC.

It also includes all of the expansion packs from the original Plague Inc. game.

Plague Inc: The Cure 
On 28 January 2021 a free DLC (now paid) was released titled Plague Inc: The Cure where the player attempts to eradicate a rapidly spreading plague by creating a cure before they lose all of their "authority" due to too many people getting panicked about disease spread.

The player can slow the spread of the plague by imposing health guidelines, public awareness schemes and continental lockdowns.

Development and release

Plague Inc: Evolved went live on Steam Early Access on 20 February 2014.

In 2014, the developer used "almost half a million pieces of feedback and feature requests from players" to help him understand what players wanted from the game and said he was "only 50 percent of the way through the original Plague Inc. design document".

A multiplayer mode, titled "VS. mode" was added to the game on 1 December 2015. In this mode, two players compete to spread their own plague across the world, while preventing in-game humans from inventing a cure and trying to eradicate the other player's disease. The mode adds new genes, evolution and abilities to the game.

The 1.0 release took place on 18 February 2016.

On August 9, 2019, Ndemic Creations released Plague Inc. Evolved for the Nintendo Switch; gameplay is operated through the Switch's Joy-Con, or the touchscreen.

Reception 

The Xbox One version of Plague Inc. Evolved has received "generally favorable reviews" from review aggregator Metacritic. Critics gave the game an average score of 80 out of 100.

In March 2016, the Italian edition of Eurogamer gave the game a 7/10 score, praising the game for its relatively complex gameplay but mildly criticising it for a lack of depth caused by its origins as a mobile game.

In October 2015, GamesRadar+ rated the game a 4 out of 5, stating that the game is a "delicate balancing act".

There was some controversy due to the nature of the game during the COVID-19 pandemic, due to this Plague Inc. The Cure was given out for free on some platforms.

References

External links
 

2015 video games
Early access video games
Fiction about parasites
Indie video games
Linux games
Medical video games
Multiplayer and single-player video games
MacOS games
PlayStation 4 games
Video games with Steam Workshop support
Top-down video games
Video games about viral outbreaks
Video games developed in the United Kingdom
Windows games
Xbox One games
Nintendo Switch games